The Braunwaldbahn, Braunwald-Standseilbahn (BRSB), or Braunwald Funicular, is a funicular railway in the canton of Glarus, Switzerland. The line links Linthal Braunwaldbahn station, on the Swiss Federal Railways' Weesen to Linthal line, with the car-free resort of Braunwald on the mountain 605 m above.

The line was opened in 1907.

Operation 
The line is operated by the Braunwald-Standseilbahn AG and has the following parameters:

See also 
 List of funicular railways
 List of funiculars in Switzerland

Further reading

References

External links 
 
 Braunwaldbahn web page
 Video of ascent of the Braunwaldbahn

Funicular railways in Switzerland
Canton of Glarus
Metre gauge railways in Switzerland